Danila Andreevich Yanov (born 27 January 2000) is a Russian footballer who plays as a midfielder for SKA-Khabarovsk on loan from FC Khimki

Career

In 2015, Yanov unsuccessfully trialed with Zürich in Switzerland and received an offer to join English Premier League side Manchester City's youth academy, but never joined due to residency problems.

At the age of 16, he debuted for Strogino Moscow in the Russian third division.

For the second half of 2017/18, Yanov rejected an offer from Portuguese outfit Leiria to sign for PFC CSKA Moscow, one of Russia's most successful clubs, where he failed to make an appearance.

On 24 January 2020, Yanov left CSKA Moscow to join Riga FC for an undisclosed fee.

On 3 September 2020, Yanov joined Pafos on a season-long loan from Riga, returning to Riga in March 2021 after his loan was ended on 10 March 2021.

Career statistics

Club

References

External links
 

2000 births
Sportspeople from Penza
Living people
Russian footballers
Russia youth international footballers
Association football midfielders
FC Strogino Moscow players
PFC CSKA Moscow players
Riga FC players
Pafos FC players
FC Olimp-Dolgoprudny players
FC Khimki players
FC Arsenal Tula players
FC SKA-Khabarovsk players
Russian Second League players
Russian First League players
Latvian Higher League players
Cypriot First Division players
Russian expatriate footballers
Expatriate footballers in Latvia
Russian expatriate sportspeople in Latvia
Expatriate footballers in Cyprus
Russian expatriate sportspeople in Cyprus